James Andreoni (born 1959 in Beloit, Wisconsin) is a Professor in the Economics Department of the University of California, San Diego where he directs the EconLab. His research focuses on behavioral economics, experimental economics, and public economics.  Andreoni is well known for his research on altruism, and in particular for coining the term warm-glow giving to describe personal gains from altruistic acts. Andreoni's research uses a mixture of economic theory, experiments, and standard analysis of survey data to explore a variety of topics including: moral decision making, time preferences, charitable giving and altruistic decisions.  His research has been described as expanding “our understanding of donors and charities and our broader understanding of public goods and expenditures.”

Career
Andreoni received his bachelor's degree from the University of Minnesota in 1981, and his PhD from the University of Michigan in 1986.  He worked at the University of Wisconsin-Madison from 1986 until 2005.  He moved to his current position at the University of California San Diego in January 2006.  According to IDEAS/RePEc as of 2018 he was ranked among the top 1% of economists in the United States.  He was the co-editor of the Journal of Public Economics, as well as an associate editor for the American Economic Review and Econometrica, among others.

From 1986-2005 Andreoni held many positions at University of Wisconsin-Madison. From 1986 to 1992 he worked as an assistant professor. He then became an associate professor in 1992 and then became a professor in 2005. From 2006 on he has been a professor at University of California San Diego. From 2007 to 2009 he was the president of the Economic Science Association. From 2009 until now he has worked as a research associate at the National Bureau of Economic Research.

Selected awards, honors and appointments
He was an Alfred P. Sloan Research Fellow from 1992-1994. He has been a Research Associate for the National Bureau of Economic Research since 2009.  And was elected as a Fellow to the Econometric Society in 2011, which is the same year he was appointed a Fellow of the Society For the Advancement of Economic Theory.

Andreoni was the President of the Economic Science Association, the professional organization of experimental economists, from 2007 to 2009 and has served as a co-founder of the Association for the Study of Generosity in Economics (ASGE) since 2013, and has served as Vice  President since.

References

1959 births
Living people
People from Beloit, Wisconsin
University of California, San Diego faculty
University of Minnesota alumni
University of Michigan College of Literature, Science, and the Arts alumni
Economists from Wisconsin
21st-century American economists
20th-century American economists
University of Wisconsin–Madison faculty
Fellows of the Econometric Society
Sloan Research Fellows
Economists from California